2010 Denmark Open is a darts tournament, which took place in Denmark in 2010.

Results

Last 32

References

2010 in darts
2010 in Danish sport
Darts in Denmark